Protestantism in South Africa accounted for 73.2% of the population in 2010. Its history dates back to the initial European settlement on the Cape of Good Hope in 1652. Since then, Protestantism has been the predominant religion of the European settlers and today, of South Africa as a whole.

Protestant churches in South Africa

According to the CIA Factbook, while the majority of South Africans are Protestant, no individual church predominates. The largest Protestant denomination in the country is Pentecostalism, followed by Methodism, Dutch Reformed and Anglicans.

Protestant denominations in South Africa include:
Afrikaanse Protestantse Kerk (Reformed/Calvinist)
Anglican Church of Southern Africa
Apostolic Faith Mission of South Africa (Pentacostalist)
Baptist Union of Southern Africa
Church of England in South Africa (outside the Anglican Communion, theological Reformed member of the World Reformed Fellowship)
Christian Reformed Church in South Africa
Free Church in Southern Africa (Presbyterian/Calvinist)
Die heilsleer (Salvation Army)
Evangelical Lutheran Church in Southern Africa
Methodist Church of Southern Africa
Nazareth Baptist Church
Nederduits Gereformeerde Kerk (Reformed/Calvinist)
Nederduitsch Hervormde Kerk van Afrika (Reformed/Calvinist)
Presbyterian Church of Africa
Reformed Churches in South Africa
United Congregational Church of Southern Africa
Uniting Presbyterian Church in Southern Africa
Uniting Reformed Church in Southern Africa
Zionist Churches (Pentacostalist)

See also
Afrikaner Calvinism
Apostolic Church of South Africa - Apostle Unity
Huguenots in South Africa
Roman Catholicism in South Africa
Islam in South Africa

Sources
 CIA Factbook on South Africa

References

Further reading
 Stephen Offutt, New Centers of Global Evangelicalism in Latin America and Africa (Cambridge University Press, 2015) focuses on El Salvador and South Africa. online review
C. Jeannerat, D. Péclard & E. Morier-Genoud, Embroiled. Swiss churches, South Africa and Apartheid, Berlin: LIT Verlag (Coll. “Schweizerische Afrikastudien/Études africaines suisses”), 2011

 
History of the Dutch East India Company